The athletics competition at the 2005 European Youth Summer Olympic Festival was held from 3 to 8 July. The events took place at the Stadio Comunale G. Teghil in Lignano Sabbiadoro, Italy. Boys and girls born 1988 or 1989 or later participated 33 track and field events, with similar programmes for the sexes with the exception of no steeplechase event for girls. A girls' and a boys' triple jump were contested for the first time.

The competition preceded the 2005 World Youth Championships in Athletics, held later that month. While no athlete at this competition went on to win at the event, several of them reached the podium: Kaire Leibak was the world youth triple jump runner-up, Danijela Grgić was second in the 400 m, António Vital e Silva won another discus throw bronze medal, while Matteo Galvan was third in the 200 m.

Kaire Leibak (the winner of both horizontal jumps) and Melissa Boekelman (shot put and discus throw winner) were the most successful athletes of the competition. Poļina Jeļizarova and Azra Eminović produced close battles in the 1500 m and 3000 m, with Jeļizarova winning the former and Eminović winning the latter event. Clélia Reuse showed versatility by taking the long jump silver before winning the 100 metres hurdles title. No male athlete won more than one individual medal, although 400 m hurdles winner Marius Kranendonk again topped the podium with the Dutch 4×100 metres relay team.

A number of B-finals were held for non-qualifying semi-finalists of some track events – most of these resulted in weaker performances than the final proper, but in the case of the boy's 800 metres the B-final was several seconds faster (indeed, the B-final seventh placer was faster than gold medallist Sören Ludolph). Girls' 800 m B-final winner Lisa Seeger was unfortunate in running a time fast enough for the bronze in the final, but having missed out by placing second in her slow qualifying heat.

Matthias De Zordo and Bohdan Bondarenko—both runner-up here—went on to be world champions in their discipline, with De Zordo winning javelin gold at the 2011 World Championships in Athletics and Bondarenko becoming high jump world champion in 2013. Triple jump winner Lyukman Adams was later a world indoor champion and girls' 100 m champion Yelyzaveta Bryzhina won Olympic and European medals.

Medal summary

Men

Women

References

Results
2005 European Youth Olympics. World Junior Athletics History. Retrieved on 2014-11-22.
European Youth Olympics. GBR Athletics. Retrieved on 2014-11-22.

External links
Official website

2005 European Youth Summer Olympic Festival
European Youth Summer Olympic Festival
2005
2005 European Youth Summer Olympic Festival